Allison Renae Holker (born February 6, 1988) is an American dancer, choreographer, and actress. Holker has worked in film, television, and concert tours. She is known for appearances on the television dance competition So You Think You Can Dance, where she was a contestant in season 2 and as an All-Star in seasons 7–11 and 14.

Early life and education
Holker was born in Anoka County, Minnesota, grew up in Orem, Utah, and graduated from Timpanogos High School in June 2006. She began her dance training at the age of nine when she enrolled as a student at The Dance Club in Orem. While she was in Orem she began to specialize in contemporary, tap, ballet, and jazz. She performed in the opening and closing ceremonies of the 2002 Winter Olympics. She has won dance titles including her first national competition in Co DANCE in 2004 and as the National Senior Outstanding Dancer at the New York City Dance Alliance in 2005.

Career
Holker performed with Earth, Wind and Fire at the opening and closing ceremonies at the Olympic Games in 2002, and in the Disney movies High School Musical and High School Musical 2. On television, she has been seen in various commercials and advanced to the Top 8 on the second season of So You Think You Can Dance, and danced in that season's SYTYCD nationwide tour. She performed with a show called Ballroom with a Twist, choreographed by Louis Van Amstel, and appeared with American Idol'''s Clay Aiken in his PBS special Tried and True. Holker was featured in the "Jar of Hearts" music video by Christina Perri. In September/October 2011 Holker was one of Demi Lovato's backup-dancers. Holker has taught at different dance conventions and workshops across the country, also branching out into choreography.
Holker was a backup-dancer on The X Factor USA working together with Brian Friedman. On April 30, 2013, she performed a dance routine on Dancing with the Stars with Stephen "tWitch" Boss. They danced to "Crystallize" which was performed live by Lindsey Stirling.

Dancing with the Stars
In August 2014, Holker was announced as one of the 12 professional dancers on the 19th season of Dancing with the Stars. The announcement of Holker, a contemporary dancer, as a cast member was met with controversy due to her limited experience with dancing and teaching Latin Ballroom dance.  She partnered with Mean Girls actor Jonathan Bennett. The couple was eliminated on Week 6, finishing in 9th place. On February 11, 2015, Holker was partnered with R5 singer and actor Riker Lynch in the show's 20th season. The couple made it to the finals and finished in second place. For season 21 she was paired with singer Andy Grammer. They were eliminated on Week 8 finishing in 7th place. She did not appear in season 22 due to pregnancy. 
Holker returned for season 23 and was  partnered with singer-songwriter Kenneth "Babyface" Edmonds. The couple were eliminated on Week 4 and finished in 11th place.

Dancing with the Stars performances
With celebrity partner: Jonathan Bennett
Season average: 28.7

1Score given by guest judge Kevin Hart in place of Goodman.

2The American public scored the dance in place of Goodman with the averaged score being counted alongside the three other judges.

3 Only for this week, "Partner Switch-Up" week, Bennett performed with Peta Murgatroyd instead of Holker. Holker performed with Antonio Sabàto, Jr.

4Score given by guest judge Jessie J in place of Goodman.

5Score given by guest judge Pitbull in place of Goodman.

With celebrity partner: Riker Lynch
Season average: 37.3

With celebrity partner: Andy Grammer
Season average: 23.88

1 Score given by guest judge Alfonso Ribeiro.

2 Only for this week, "Partner Switch-Up" week, Grammer performed with Sharna Burgess instead of Holker. Holker performed with Hayes Grier.

3 Score given by guest judge Maksim Chmerkovskiy.

4 Score given by guest judge Olivia Newton-John.

With celebrity partner: BabyfaceSeason average: 26.3Personal life

In 2008, Holker had a daughter with an ex-fiancé. Holker's daughter was later adopted by tWitch after he and Holker were married.

In 2013, Holker and fellow So You Think You Can Dance all-star, Stephen "tWitch" Boss, were married at Villa San-Juliette Winery in Paso Robles, California, owned by SYTYCD'' producer and judge Nigel Lythgoe. The couple have two children together, a son born in 2016 and a daughter born in 2019.

On December 14, 2022, it was announced that Boss, Holker's husband, had died by suicide the day before.

Awards

 2004, National Senior Performer of the Year from Company Dance
 2005, National Senior Outstanding Dancing for New York City Dance Alliance
 2007, National Senior Dancer of the Year
 2013, Primetime Emmy Award Nomination for Outstanding Choreography

References

External links
 Allison Holker Fansite
 

1988 births
American female dancers
Dancers from Minnesota
Dancers from Utah
Living people
People from Orem, Utah
So You Think You Can Dance (American TV series) contestants
21st-century American dancers
21st-century American women